The 17th (County of London) Battalion, The London Regiment (Poplar and Stepney Rifles), was a unit of Britain's Territorial Force formed in 1908 from Volunteer corps dating back to 1859. It saw considerable service on the Western Front, at Salonika and in Palestine during World War I. It served as an infantry regiment during World War II before conversion to an artillery unit in 1947 and subsequent amalgamation in 1967.

Background
The London Regiment was created in 1908 as part of the Haldane Reforms, and consisted entirely of Territorial Force (TF) infantry battalions, with no Regular component. Its Poplar and Stepney Rifles Battalion was formed by merging two Volunteer Corps that had previously been affiliated to the Rifle Brigade (The Prince Consort's Own). Their headquarters were at 66 Tredegar Road, until the drill hall was demolished in the 1960s.

Rifle Volunteers 1859-1908

15th Middlesex (The Customs and Docks) Rifle Volunteer Corps

The invasion scare of 1859 led to the creation of the Volunteer Force and huge enthusiasm for joining local Rifle Volunteer Corps (RVCs). The 26th recruited from customs officers in the London docks and amalgamated with the 9th Tower Hamlets Rifle Volunteers in 1864. It was renumbered 15th in 1881 and became a volunteer Battalion of the Rifle Brigade (The Prince Consort's Own).

2nd Tower Hamlets Rifle Volunteer Corps
The unit was formed as the 1st Administrative Battalion, Tower Hamlets Rifle Volunteer Corps, in May 1861. It was formed by the grouping of six smaller rifle volunteer corps formed in 1860. The headquarters were established at Truman's Brewery, Spitalfields. 
It was renumbered 2nd in 1881 and also became a volunteer Battalion of the Rifle Brigade (The Prince Consort's Own). In 1892 its headquarters were at 237 Whitechapel Road.

Territorial Force
In 1908 on the formation of the Territorial Force the 15th Middlesex and 2nd Tower Hamlets were amalgamated to form the 17th (County of London) Battalion, London Regiment (Poplar and Stepney Rifles) (Territorial Force).

First World War

With the outbreak of war in August 1914 the Territorial Force (TF) was mobilised. The size of the TF was increased by the formation of duplicates of the pre-war units.
The existing battalion became the 1/17th Battalion, and served on the Western Front from 1915-18. A duplicate 2/17th Battalion was formed in August 1914. It was briefly in France before taking part in the Macedonian and Palestinian campaigns. A 3/17th Battalion was formed in 1915. It was a reserve unit and did not serve outside the UK.

Interwar period
In 1926 the battalion was re-designated the 17th London Regiment (Tower Hamlets Rifles). In 1937 it became the Tower Hamlets Rifles, Rifle Brigade (Prince Consort's Own).

Second World War
In late May 1941 the Regiment was redesignated again to create the 9th Battalion, The Rifle Brigade (Prince Consort’s Own). The battalion was part of the 2nd Support Group of the 2nd Armoured Division and then the 200th Guards Brigade until June 1942. The 9th later served with the 4th Armoured Brigade in the 7th Armoured Division and took part in the Battle of Gazala in May 1942 during the North African Campaign before being disbanded in August 1942.

The 10th Battalion was formed in 1941 by the redesignation of the 2nd Battalion, Tower Hamlets Rifles and transferred to the 26th Armoured Brigade of the 6th Armoured Division, seeing service with the division in Tunisia in 1943 before, in May 1944, transferring to the 61st Lorried Infantry Brigade, serving alongside the 2nd and 7th Battalions of the Rifle Brigade in the Italian Campaign. However, the battalion was disbanded in late March 1945, with most of the personnel being sent to the 2nd Battalion.

Post War
On the re-establishment of the Territorial Army in 1947 both Tower Hamlets Battalions (9th and 10th) of the Rifle Brigade were amalgamated to form 656th Light Anti-Aircraft Regiment, Royal Artillery (Tower Hamlets) TA, with headquarters at Bow. in 1955 it was amalgamated with the 512th (Finsbury Rifles) and 568th (St Pancras) Light Anti-Aircraft Regiments RA (TA), being reduced to 'P' Battery in the new Regiment. A further amalgamation in 1961 created 300th Light Anti-Aircraft Regiment, RA (TA), subsequently re-designated 300th (Tower Hamlets) Light Air Defence Regiment RA (TA). In 1967 it was again amalgamated to form The Greater London Regiment and the Tower Hamlets lineage was lost.

Memorials
The battalion's First World War memorial is now located in an Army Reserve Centre at 405 Mile End Road in Bow, London.

References

Bibliography
 Maj R. Money Barnes, The Soldiers of London, London: Seeley Service, 1963.
 Maj A. F. Becke,History of the Great War: Order of Battle of Divisions, Part 2a: The Territorial Force Mounted Divisions and the 1st-Line Territorial Force Divisions (42–56), London: HM Stationery Office, 1935/Uckfield: Naval & Military Press, 2007, .
 Maj A. F. Becke,History of the Great War: Order of Battle of Divisions, Part 2b: The 2nd-Line Territorial Force Divisions (57th–69th), with the Home-Service Divisions (71st–73rd) and 74th and 75th Divisions, London: HM Stationery Office, 1937/Uckfield: Naval & Military Press, 2007, .
 Ian F. W. Beckett, Riflemen Form: A study of the Rifle Volunteer Movement 1859–1908, Aldershot: Ogilby Trusts, 1982, .
 David L. Bullock, Allenby's War: The Palestine-Arabian Campaigns 1916–1918, London: Blandford Press, 1988, .
 Niall Cherry, Most Unfavourable Ground: The Battle of Loos 1915, Solihull: Helion, 2005, .
 T L Craze, The Tower Hamlets Rifles: A short history, Winchester, 1985
 Col P. H. Dalbaic, History of the 60th Division (2/2nd London Division), London: George Allen & Unwin, 1927/Uckfield: Naval & Military Press, 2003.
 Brig-Gen Sir James E. Edmonds, History of the Great War: Military Operations, France and Belgium 1918, Vol V, 26th September–11th November, The Advance to Victory, London: HM Stationery Office, 1947/Imperial War Museum and Battery Press, 1993, .
 Clive Elderton and Andrew Sargent, The Bow Church Memorial Cross and the Battle of Loos, 1915. St Stephens, St Mary's and the Poplar and Stepney Rifles, Bow Church, London, 2017, 
 Major L. F. Ellis, History of the Second World War, United Kingdom Military Series: Victory in the West, Vol II: The Defeat of Germany, London: HM Stationery Office, 1968/Uckfield: Naval & Military Press, 2004, .
 
 Norman E. H. Litchfield, The Territorial Artillery 1908–1988 (Their Lineage, Uniforms and Badges), Nottingham: Sherwood Press, 1992, .
 Alan H. Maude (ed.), The History of the 47th (London) Division 1914–1919, London: Amalgamated Press, 1922/Uckfield: Naval & Military Press, 2002, .
 Lt-Col H. R. Martin, Historical Record of the London Regiment, 2nd Edn (nd)
 Osborne, Mike, 2006. Always Ready: The Drill Halls of Britain's Volunteer Forces, Partizan Press, Essex. 
 Brig N. W. Routledge, History of the Royal Regiment of Artillery: Anti-Aircraft Artillery 1914–55, London: Royal Artillery Institution/Brassey's, 1994, .
 Titles and Designations of Formations and Units of the Territorial Army, London: War Office, 7 November 1927.
 Westlake, Ray, 2010. Tracing the Rifle Volunteers, Barnsley: Pen and Sword, .
 Wilcox, Ray, 2005. The Poplars: What life was like on the Western Front in the First World War as experienced by the 1/17th London Regiment, East London History Society, .

Battalions of the London Regiment (1908–1938)
Military units and formations in London
Military units and formations in Tower Hamlets